Hesperophanoschema hirsutum is a species of beetle in the family Cerambycidae, the only species in the genus Hesperophanoschema.

References

Hesperophanini